Overcast is an iOS app by Marco Arment which downloads and plays podcasts. It has been positively reviewed by several journalists, with The Verge and The Sweet Setup both naming it as the best podcast listening app for iOS in 2015 and subsequent years.

Overcast was originally announced at the XOXO festival in 2013 during a talk by Arment on competition and the risks and benefits of how crowded a creative field is.

Unique listening features include "Smart Speed", which shortens quiet gaps in the podcast, and "Voice Boost", which balances out the EQ across all podcasts "so every show is loud, clear, and at the same volume."

In April 2019, Overcast introduced a feature that allowed users to share clips from podcasts to social media.

In January 2020, Overcast was updated to allow users to skip the intros and outros of podcasts.

References

External links 
 
 

Mobile applications
iOS software
watchOS software
Podcasting software